Bronisławów may refer to the following places:
Bronisławów, Kutno County in Łódź Voivodeship (central Poland)
Bronisławów, Piotrków County in Łódź Voivodeship (central Poland)
Bronisławów, Rawa County in Łódź Voivodeship (central Poland)
Bronisławów, Sieradz County in Łódź Voivodeship (central Poland)
Bronisławów, Tomaszów Mazowiecki County in Łódź Voivodeship (central Poland)
Bronisławów, Zgierz County in Łódź Voivodeship (central Poland)
Bronisławów, Świętokrzyskie Voivodeship (south-central Poland)
Bronisławów, Białobrzegi County in Masovian Voivodeship (east-central Poland)
Bronisławów, Grodzisk Mazowiecki County in Masovian Voivodeship (east-central Poland)
Bronisławów, Gmina Błędów in Masovian Voivodeship (east-central Poland)
Bronisławów, Gmina Jasieniec in Masovian Voivodeship (east-central Poland)
Bronisławów, Lipsko County in Masovian Voivodeship (east-central Poland)
Bronisławów, Piaseczno County in Masovian Voivodeship (east-central Poland)
Bronisławów, Żyrardów County in Masovian Voivodeship (east-central Poland)